Zaterdag Sportvereniging Sportlust '46, more commonly known as ZSV Sportlust '46 or simply Sportlust '46, is a Dutch football club based in Woerden, Utrecht. It currently plays in the Derde Divisie, the fourth tier of Dutch football. Formed on 5 October 1946, Sportlust has spent its entire existence in the amateur tiers, bouncing between the Vierde Klasse and the Derde Divisie – the ninth and the fourth tier, respectively. 

The club plays their home games at Sportpark Cromwijck. The club colours, reflected in their crest and kit, are red and white.

History
After decades in the lower tiers of amateur football, the Sportlust '46 first team made a leap in the Dutch football pyramid after the turn of the century, where they promoted to the Hoofdklasse for the first time in the 2011–12 season.

In 2019, Sportlust '46 won a championship in the Saturday Eerste Klasse, and promoted to the Hoofdklasse. In 2020, the club won promotion to the fourth-tier Derde Divisie, their second successive promotion, after leading their group at the onset of the COVID-19 pandemic. This was made possible due to the enlargement of the Derde Divisie to 36 teams.

In the 2021–22 Derde Divisie season, Sportlust '46 qualified for the promotion playoffs, but they were eliminated after a 4–1 second leg loss to Kozakken Boys in the first round.

Managers 
 Ruud Bos (1979–86)
 Peter van Boeijen (1994–96)
 Jan van den Heuvel (1998–2001)
 Robbert de Ruiter (2001–03)
 Wim Berckenkamp (2003–04)
 Jan van den Heuvel (2004–07)
 Koos van Zoest (2007–10)
 Carl Flux (2010–11)
 Cesco Agterberg (2011–12)
 Richard Middelkoop (2012–15)
 Dennis Sluijk (2015)
 Wim van 't Westeinde (2016–18)
 Patrick Loenen (2018–)

References

External links
 Official site

Sportlust '46
Football clubs in the Netherlands
Football clubs in Utrecht (province)
1946 establishments in the Netherlands
Association football clubs established in 1946
Sport in Woerden